Christopher James Townsend (born 1 September 1972) is an English educator and former first-class cricketer.

Born at Wokingham, Townsend studied classics at Brasenose College, Oxford. While at Brasenose he made his debut in first-class cricket for Oxford University against Middlesex at Oxford in 1992. He played first-class cricket for Oxford on 22 occasions until 1995, playing his final match against Cambridge University at Lord's. He scored 141 runs in these matches, and in his capacity as wicket-keeper he took 34 catches and made five stumpings. After graduating from Oxford, Townsend moved into education. He later played a first-class match for the Marylebone Cricket Club against New Zealand A at Oxford in 2000.

He was appointed the headmaster of Felsted School in March 2015, replacing Dr. Mike Walker.

References

External links

1972 births
Living people
People from Wokingham
Alumni of Brasenose College, Oxford
English cricketers
Oxford University cricketers
Marylebone Cricket Club cricketers
Schoolteachers from Essex
Heads of schools in England